Mary Bliss Parsons (1628–1712) was an American woman who was accused of witchcraft, but was exonerated, in 17th-century Massachusetts.

Background
Parsons was born to Thomas and Margaret (Hulins) Bliss in Gloucestershire, England in 1628.  Her family later immigrated to Hartford, Connecticut, where she married Joseph Parsons on November 2, 1646.  The couple later moved to  Springfield, Massachusetts.  In 1655, Joseph Parsons purchased a land tract from the local Native Americans in what would become Northampton.

The Parsonses became financially successful members of the Northampton community, owning property in Springfield, Hadley, Massachusetts and Boston as well as in Northampton.

The Feud 

In the early 1650s a feud developed between the Parsonses and a neighboring family, the Bridgmans. Parsons was said to have a strong personality, which had led to rumors following her from Springfield.  Unlike the Parsonses, the Bridgmans were struggling financially. In addition, Mary Parsons had several healthy children while Sarah Bridgman had lost several children. People in the town started blaming Parsons for the death of livestock and injuries to people.  Bridgman began to spread rumours about Parsons, claiming that she had threatened her son and that she was a witch. When Parsons's mother confronted Bridgman, she claimed to have heard a story that Parsons had cursed a blind man’s daughter in Springfield, causing the girl to have fits.

The Slander Trial 

In 1656 Joseph Parsons filed slander charges against Sarah Bridgman on behalf of his wife in the trial Parsons v. Bridgman. He charged that Bridgman had spread rumors about Parsons,  insinuating that she was a witch.  Testimony from Bridgman and witness made it clear that rumours had been circulating, fueled by jealousy and resentment of the Parsons family's success.  Mary Parsons’s mother, Margaret Bliss, testified that Bridgman told her that Parsons was a witch.

The court ruled in favor of Parsons.  Bridgman was ordered to make a public apology and pay a fine and court costs.

The Witchcraft Trial 
In 1674, Bridgman charged Parsons with witchcraft. After her slander lawsuit, the rumors in Northampton about Parsons being a witch had subsided.  However, the sudden death of Sarah Bridgman’s daughter, Mary Bartlett in July 1674 prompted her mother to formally accuse Parsons of witchcraft.

In September 1675, the local magistrates ordered a search of Parsons’ body for "Witches' marks".  It is not known if any marks were found.  The magistrates  then decided to send her to Boston for trial at the Court of Assistants.  After a trial, the court in Boston acquitted Parsons of witchcraft.

Aftermath 
Despite Parsons's acquittal in Boston, the witchcraft rumors persisted in Northampton.  In 1679 or 1680, the Parsons family moved back to Springfield.  However, the rumors followed the Parsons family back to Springfield. In 1702, someone told Parsons's grandson  that his grandmother was a witch.

Mary Parsons lived for 30 years after her husband died in 1683.  She was forced to face witchcraft rumors for the remainder of her life. Parsons died in Springfield at age 84 January 29, 1712.

Children 
 Joseph, 1 Nov. 1647 - 29 Nov. 1729 - he would later be a judge in New Hampshire.
 Benjamin, 22 Jan. - 22 June 1649
 John, 14 Aug. 1650 - 15 April 1728
 Samuel, 23 Jan. 1652 - 12 Nov. 1734
 Ebenezer, 1 May 1655 - 8 Sept. 1675
 Jonathan, 6 June 1657 - 19 Oct. 1694
 David, 30 April 1659 - same.
 Mary, 27 June 1661 - 23 Aug 1711
 Hannah, 1 Aug. 1663 - 1 April 1739
 Abigail, 3 Sept. 1666 - 27 June 1689
 Esther (recorded as Hester), 4 Dec. 1672 - 30 May 1760

References 

17th-century American women
17th-century English people
18th-century American women
People acquitted of witchcraft